John Watson is a former Scottish lawn and indoor bowler and was born in Scotland on 22 November 1945.

Watson came to prominence in 1975 after winning the Scottish Indoor Junior Singles title. Three years later he defeated Jim Blake in the Scottish National Singles final and then won his first international indoor cap in 1979. 
Watson won the 1982 World Indoor Bowls Championship but refused to accept his prize money so that he could compete in the 1982 Commonwealth Games.
the decision to compete in the Commonwealth Games proved fruitful because he won the Pairs Gold Medal with David Gourlay Sr.

References

Scottish male bowls players
Living people
1945 births
Bowls players at the 1982 Commonwealth Games
Commonwealth Games medallists in lawn bowls
Commonwealth Games gold medallists for Scotland
Indoor Bowls World Champions
Medallists at the 1982 Commonwealth Games